Dubovsky is a rural locality (a khutor) in Shakinskoye Rural Settlement, Kumylzhensky District, Volgograd Oblast, Russia. The population was 23 as of 2010. There is 1 street.

Geography 
Dubovsky is located in forest steppe, on Khopyorsko-Buzulukskaya Plain, on the bank of the Srednyaya Yelan River, 25 km southwest of Kumylzhenskaya (the district's administrative centre) by road. Devkin is the nearest rural locality.

References 

Rural localities in Kumylzhensky District